Sumbermujur is a village in Candipuro District, Lumajang Regency in East Java Province. Its population is 6332.

Climate
Sumbermujur has a subtropical highland climate (Cfb). It has moderate rainfall from June to September and heavy to very heavy rainfall in the remaining months.

References

Villages in East Java